Devils Lake is a city in Ramsey County, North Dakota, United States. It is the county seat of Ramsey County. The population was 7,192 at the 2020 census. It is named after the nearby body of water called Devils Lake. The first house in Devils Lake was built in 1882. It was surveyed in 1883 and named Creelsburg and later Creel City, after the surveyor, Heber M. Creel. In 1884 it was renamed Devils Lake.

The local paper is the Devils Lake Journal. Devils Lake Municipal Airport serves the city. Devils Lake is home to Lake Region State College and the North Dakota School for the Deaf.

History

The present site of Devils Lake was, historically, a territory of the Dakota people.  However, the Sisseton, Wahpeton, and Cut-Head bands of the Dakotas were relocated to the Spirit Lake Reservation as a result of the 1867 treaty between the United States and the Dakota that established a reservation for those who had not been forcibly relocated to Crow Creek Reservation in what is now South Dakota. The name "Devils Lake" is a calque of the Dakota phrase mni wak’áŋ (literally translating to spirit water), which is also reflected in the names of the Spirit Lake Tribe and the nearby town of Minnewaukan.

The Dakota called the lake mni wak’áŋ, which separately translates as mni (water) and wak’áŋ (literally meaning "pure source" but often translated as "spirit" or "sacred"). The European-American settlers misconstrued this name to mean "Bad Spirit Lake" or "Devils Lake."  The "bad" referred to the high salinity of the lake, making it unfit to drink, and "spirit" referenced the mirages often seen across the water.  The Christian concept of the devil was not present in the Dakota philosophy and religious practices.

The Hidatsa name for the lake is mirixubaash ( meaning "sacred water").

The first post office was founded November 15, 1882, and was originally named Creelsburg. It was founded by Lieutenant Heber M. Creel, a West Point graduate and topographical engineer stationed at nearby Fort Totten. After resigning from the U.S. Army, he surveyed the land and established the townsite.

The surrounding Creel Township is named for Mr. Creel. The name was later changed to Creel City and expanded by the Great Northern Railway. When the village was incorporated in 1884, the name was changed to City of Devils Lake and then shortened to Devils Lake.

During a period of increased rainfall, beginning in the 1990s and unprecedented in the history of North Dakota, caused the nearby lake, which has no natural outlet, to rise.  The surface area has quadrupled, and the higher water has resulted in the moving or destruction of over 400 houses.

Geography and climate

Like all of North Dakota, Devils Lake has a humid continental climate (Köppen Dfb) with very cold winters with frequent light snowfall, and warm to very warm, wetter summers with most rain from convective thunderstorms. During the 1936 North American cold wave, the town was one of the coldest places south of the Canada–US border, averaging  for the five weeks ending February 21, 1936 (though at a different site from that now in use). On average 53.4 nights fall to or below , 104.1 days fail to top freezing, and 184.5 nights fall below . In the winter, only 17.5 days on average top freezing, and in severe winters months can pass without even a minor thaw. Extreme heat is rare in summer, with only one day in three years topping , and only 9.3 topping .

Demographics

2010 census
As of the census of 2010, there were 7,141 people, 3,229 households, and 1,712 families living in the city. The racial makeup of the city was 82.9% White, 0.5% African American, 12.5% Native American, 0.4% Asian, 0.3% from other races, and 3.4% from two or more races. Hispanic or Latino of any race were 1.3% of the population.

There were 3,229 households, of which 26.0% had children under the age of 18 living with them, 36.0% were married couples living together, 12.7% had a female householder with no husband present, 4.3% had a male householder with no wife present, and 47.0% were non-families. 41.8% of all households were made up of individuals, and 17.3% had someone living alone who was 65 years of age or older. The average household size was 2.07 and the average family size was 2.80.

The median age in the city was 40.4 years. 21.6% of residents were under the age of 18; 10.9% were between the ages of 18 and 24; 22.3% were from 25 to 44; 26.1% were from 45 to 64; and 19.2% were 65 years of age or older. The gender makeup of the city was 48.1% male and 51.9% female.

2000 census
As of the census of 2000, there were 7,222 people, 3,127 households, and 1,773 families living in the city. The racial makeup of the city was 89.23% White, 0.22% African American, 7.84% Native American, 0.28% Asian, 0.21% from other races, and 2.23% from two or more races. Hispanic or Latino of any race were 0.55% of the population.

The top 6 ancestry groups in the city are German (43.9%), Norwegian (33.4%), Irish (7.6%), French (4.7%), Swedish (4.5%), English (2.7%).

There were 3,127 households, out of which 27.5% had children under the age of 18 living with them, 41.2% were married couples living together, 11.3% had a female householder with no husband present, and 43.3% were non-families. 37.7% of all households were made up of individuals, and 18.0% had someone living alone who was 65 years of age or older. The average household size was 2.18 and the average family size was 2.87.

In the city, the population was spread out, with 24.0% under the age of 18, 10.0% from 18 to 24, 25.6% from 25 to 44, 19.3% from 45 to 64, and 21.1% who were 65 years of age or older. The median age was 38 years. For every 100 females, there were 89.8 males. For every 100 females age 18 and over, there were 85.0 males.

The median income for a household in the city was $31,250, and the median income for a family was $39,541. Males had a median income of $27,972 versus $18,000 for females. The per capita income for the city was $17,741. About 11.2% of families and 16.1% of the population were below the poverty line, including 22.7% of those under age 18 and 8.6% of those age 65 or over.

Education

K–12

The city of Devils Lake is served by Devils Lake Public Schools. This system operates Sweetwater Elementary School, Prairie View Elementary School, Minnie H Elementary School, Central Middle School, and Devils Lake High School.

A private school, St. Joseph's Catholic School (of the Roman Catholic Diocese of Fargo), is also located in Devils Lake.

Higher education

 Lake Region State College

Sports

 Devils Lake Storm of North Dakota American Legion Baseball
 Devils Lake Firebirds
 Lake Region State College Royals – NJCAA

Media

Print
 Devils Lake Journal

Television

 8 WDAZ (8.1 ABC, 8.2 The CW, 8.3 Weather) – digital only – licensed to Devils Lake with news bureau in Grand Forks, but based at WDAY-TV in Fargo
 25 KMDE (25.1 & 25.2 PBS/Prairie Public Television, 25.3 Minnesota Channel) – digital only

Radio

FM
 89.9 KDVI American Family Radio (Christian)
 90.7 KABU (Tribal radio – Spirit Lake Indian Reservation)
 91.7 KPPD Prairie Public Radio/NPR (Public/Classical/Jazz)
 95.3 KKWZ (owned by De La Hunt Broadcasting)
 96.7 KQZZ "The Mix" (Hot Adult Contemporary)
 99.7 KDLR (Classic country)
 102.5 KDVL "Cruiser 102" (Classic Hits)
 103.5 KZZY "Double Z Country" (Country)
 104.5 K283AM broadcast translator of KHRT-FM of Minot, ND (contemporary Christian music)

Transportation
Amtrak, the U.S. national passenger rail system, serves Devils Lake, operating its Empire Builder daily in both directions between Chicago and Seattle and Portland, Oregon. SkyWest Air Lines also operates two flights daily to the Devils Lake Municipal Airport from Denver International Airport.

Sites of interest
 Devils Lake Town and Country Club
 Devils Lake Basin Joint Water Resource Board http://www.dlbasin.com

Notable people

 
Phyllis Frelich, Tony Award-winning deaf actress
 William L. Guy, Governor of North Dakota
 Rick Helling, Pitcher with several Major League Baseball teams
 Ralph Maxwell, North Dakota state court judge and athlete
 Mary Wakefield, Administrator of Health Resources and Services Administration
 Owen Webster, Organic and polymer chemist

References

External links

 City of Devils Lake official website
 Devils Lake Chamber of Commerce
 Mother Nature In Charge: Devils Lake The Dilemma Documentary produced by Prairie Public Television
 A bicentennial history of Devils Lake, North Dakota (1976) from the Digital Horizons website
Devils Lake's seventy-five years :official souvenir program (1957) from the Digital Horizons website

Cities in North Dakota
Cities in Ramsey County, North Dakota
County seats in North Dakota
Populated places established in 1882
1882 establishments in Dakota Territory